Dane Sharp (born January 1, 1985 in Toronto, Ontario) is a professional squash player who represents Canada. He reached a career-high world ranking of World No. 79 in April 2014. Dane currently works as a squash pro at Merion Cricket Club.

References

External links 
 
 

1985 births
Living people
Canadian male squash players
Sportspeople from Toronto
21st-century Canadian people